Alwyn is a name, primarily used as a given name.

Notable people with the name include:

Given name 
Alwyn Bramley-Moore (1878–1916), politician and soldier from Alberta, Canada
Alwyn Davey (born 1984), Indigenous Australian rules footballer
Alwyn Eato (born 1929), English cricketer
Alwyn Hamilton, author of Rebel of the Sands
Alwyn Jones (biophysicist) (born 1947), Welsh biophysicist and professor at the University of Uppsala
Alwyn Jones (athlete) (born 1985), Australian triple jumper
Alwyn Kurts (1915–2000), Australian drama and comedy actor
Alwyn MacArchill (12th century), a rannair to the King of Scots
Alwyn Morris (born 1957), Canadian flatwater canoeist
Alwyn Myburgh (born 1980), South African hurdler
Alwyn Rice Jones (1934–2007), Archbishop of Wales from 1991 to 1999
Alwyn Schlebusch (1917–2008), Vice State President of South Africa 1981–1984
Alwyn Scott (born 1963), American business journalist and editor
Alwyn Sheppard Fidler CBE (1909–1990), Welsh architect and town planner
Alwyn Wall, of British gospel beat group Malcolm and Alwyn
Alwyn Williams (bishop) (1888–1968), Bishop of Durham, 1939–52, and Bishop of Winchester, 1952–61
Alwyn Williams (geologist) (1921–2004), Welsh geologist
Alwyn Young, professor of economics at the London School of Economics and Political Science

Surname 
Joe Alwyn (born 1991), English actor
Kenneth Alwyn (1925–2020), British orchestral conductor
Nicholas Alwyn (born 1938), English first class cricketer
William Alwyn, CBE (1905–1985), English composer, conductor, and music teacher